Acrobasis evanescentella is a species of snout moth in the genus Acrobasis. It was described by Harrison Gray Dyar Jr., in 1908, and is known from southern Georgia and Florida.

There is probably only one generation per year with adults on wing in late May.

The larvae feed on Carya species, including Carya illinoensis. They tunnel into the shoots of their host plant. Pupation occurs in the soil.

References

Moths described in 1908
Acrobasis
Moths of North America